State Highway 151 (SH 151) is a  state highway in far southern Colorado. SH 151's western terminus is at SH 172 in Ignacio, and the eastern terminus is at U.S. Route 160 (US 160) east of Chimney Rock.

Route description
SH 151 begins in the west at its junction with SH 172 in Ignacio on the Southern Ute Indian Reservation. From there, the road proceeds generally eastward with a southern arc past Allison and through Arboles. The route then turns to the northeast passing near Navajo State Park and across the Piedra River.  from its western end at Ignacio, SH 151 enters San Juan National Forest through which it continues to its eastern endpoint at US 160 roughly six miles east of Chimney Rock.

Major intersections

References

External links

151
Transportation in La Plata County, Colorado
Transportation in Archuleta County, Colorado